Isomma is a genus of dragonflies in the family Gomphidae. It is endemic to Madagascar and contains only two species:

Isomma elouardi 
Isomma hieroglyphicum

References

Gomphidae
Anisoptera genera
Taxa named by Edmond de Sélys Longchamps
Taxonomy articles created by Polbot